J'son is a fictional character appearing in American comic books published by Marvel Comics. He is the father of Star-Lord and Victoria (a Captain from Spartax).

Publication history
Emperor Jason of Spartax first appeared in Marvel Preview #11 and was created by Chris Claremont and John Byrne. Emperor Jason was the father of the Star-Lord character who had been introduced in Marvel Preview #4.

Prince Jason of Spartax is a character that first appears in Inhumans vol. 3 #2 in the year 2000. He was originally intended to be Jason from Marvel Preview #11, but earlier in history.

After 2004 when Peter Quill was introduced into the Earth-616 continuity, the problems that were caused by Quill's presence in the then present-day Marvel Universe were never officially explained by Marvel Comics.

In 2013, King J'son of Spartax was introduced in Guardians of the Galaxy vol. 3 #0.1. As reimagined by writer Brian Michael Bendis and artist Steve McNiven, this character is definitively identified as being the father of the Star-Lord who existed in the present-day Marvel Universe of Earth-616. Due to the continuity issues that this revised origin story caused, Marvel Comics decided that there were two versions of Star-Lord and that the events of Marvel Preview #11 and other appearances of the "classic" Star-Lord were to be officially designated as occurring in Earth-791.

Fictional character biography
When J'son's ship crash lands on Earth, he is taken in by Meredith Quill. The two form a relationship while J'son makes repairs to his ship. Eventually, J'son is forced to leave to return home and fight in a war. He leaves, not knowing Meredith is pregnant with Peter Quill.

Years later, J'son is revealed to be the King of the Spartax planetary system. J'son joined other members of the Galactic Council to declare the Earth off-limits to extraterrestrial interaction. Once his son defended Earth from a Badoon attack, J'son sent Spartoi soldiers to capture him, and his team called the Guardians of the Galaxy. However, the Guardians managed to escape and flee.

In an attempt to finally get rid of the Guardians and make his son join him, all of the Guardians were separately dealt with by the Spartoi and its allies under Captain Victoria, J'son's illegitimate child. However, they didn't count with the Guardians' ally Captain Marvel, who saved Peter Quill from J'son and the Spartoi Empire. As he was escaping, Quill discredited J'son to the whole empire revealing him as a heartless murderer. The entire Spartoi Empire rebelled against J'son, who was forced to flee.

With no longer an empire or fortune as seen in The Black Vortex storyline, J'son became the villain known as Mister Knife and started building a criminal empire. He put a bounty on his son, and also assembled the Slaughter Squad to recover the Black Vortex.

Because of the price put on his head, Star-Lord began raiding Mister Knife's crime syndicate, unaware that he was dealing with his own father. After the Slaughter Squad managed to finally capture Star-Lord while he was on a date with Kitty Pryde, Mister Knife revealed his identity to his son.

After Peter escaped with the help of Kitty Pryde, who traveled all the way from Earth to save him, J'son was tracked down to a planet where Thanos' son Thane is and convinced him to join his cause.

After Star-Lord and Kitty Pryde decided to steal the Black Vortex from J'son with the sole purpose to annoy him, Mister Knife sent the Slaughter Lords to hunt them down and recover the Vortex. After numerous failed attempts to recover the Vortex, Mister Knife managed to get his hands on it. As part of a deal with Thane, he submitted to the Black Vortex and used his cosmically enhanced power to encase the entirety of Spartax in his amber construct. The trapped Spartax was later traded to the Brood by Mister Knife, in exchange for taking advantage of their expansion and acquiring one planet for every ten worlds they conquered ever since.

At a moment when Captain Marvel retrieved the Black Vortex, she was cornered by Thane and J'son, who demanded she give them the Vortex back. When Thane tried to use his powers to encase Carol in amber, she used the Black Vortex as a shield and deflected the attack towards J'son.

J'son remained encased in the amber construct floating through Spartax's orbit, until he was found by the Collector, who was too late to recover the Vortex, but settled for adding J'son to his collection. J'son's amber construct imprisonment was later recovered by his daughter Victoria and brought back to Spartax.

Powers and abilities
J'son of Spartax uses Spartax weapons and under his Mister Knife persona, wields a fortress capable of destroying planets.

Other versions

Earth-791
Jason first appears in Marvel Preview #11, but after Peter Quill's introduction to Earth-616 in 2004, this issue and other appearances of "classic" Star-Lord have been officially designated as occurring in Earth-791 due to continuity issues. In this issue, Star-Lord meets his father and learns of his past. Years earlier, Jason was summoned by his father when war broke out between the Spartoi and the Ariguans. On his way back home, he was forced to crash land on Earth, where he fell in love with a human woman named Meredith Quill. The two began a year-long relationship before Jason was forced to leave to wage war for Spartax. Wishing to shield Meredith from the pain of his departure, Jason erased her memories of him. Meredith would later go on to give birth to his son Peter Quill. Jason would eventually go on take his father's place as emperor. After telling Star-Lord this story, Jason offered him a place as heir to the throne. Peter refused, and in his stead, Jason adopted Kip Holm as future heir.

Inhumans vol. 3
Jason is from the Spartoi Empire where the Spartoi are a sister race to the Shi'ar, separating from their cousins millions of years ago. He was the only son of the previous Emperor Eson, and therefore was Prince and sole heir to the throne. Rejecting his idealism, the ruling Council of Ministers prevented J'son from taking the throne. The future emperor would be educated, as per Spartax tradition, by being brought up on dozens of the Empire's planets working many professions, including servant, miner, poet, soldier and pilot - excelling in the latter two.

When Ronan the Accuser of the Kree Empire forced the Inhuman Royal Family to attempt to assassinate the Empress Lilandra, ruler of the neighboring Shi'ar Empire during a wedding ceremony that would symbolically unite the Shi'ar and Spartoi, J'son (who had been seen with the Inhumans) was accused of being part of the plot. For this, he was banished and deemed unworthy of the throne.

While the events of Inhumans vol. 3 take place in Earth-616, this incarnation of Jason causes continuity issues with the J'son introduced in Guardians of the Galaxy Vol. 3. For this reason, it is assumed that these are two difference characters, although no official explanation has been given for these continuity issues.

In other media
J'son appears in the animated series Guardians of the Galaxy, voiced by Jonathan Frakes. He is the Emperor of Spartax and the father of Peter Quill by Meredith Quill as well as being the father of Captain Victoria. In addition, he is a secret ally of Thanos. The episode "Black Vortex" featured a version of J'son called J. Jonah J'son (also voiced by Frakes) who is the boss of Arthur Douglas and a parody of J. Jonah Jameson.
In Guardians of the Galaxy Vol. 2, Ego is the father of the Marvel Cinematic Universe version of Star-Lord rather than J'son. Director and writer James Gunn explained why he made the change: "I just don't like the character [J'son] very much", he said. "I also thought it was too much like a Star Wars thing because of the royalty and all of that".

References

External links
 J'son at Marvel Wiki
 J'son at Comic Vine
 

Fictional mass murderers
Characters created by Chris Claremont
Characters created by John Byrne (comics)
Comics characters introduced in 1977
Fictional crime bosses
Fictional emperors and empresses
Guardians of the Galaxy characters
Marvel Comics supervillains